Çikan (formerly Doğucak) is a village in the Yayladere District, Bingöl Province, Turkey. The village is populated by Kurds of the Seter tribe and had a population of 66 in 2021.

The hamlets of Bakımlı, Eğrice, Halil and Yıldızlı are attached to the village.

References 

Villages in Yayladere District
Kurdish settlements in Bingöl Province